Mount Lowe may refer to:
 Mount Lowe (Antarctica), a mountain in Antarctica
 Mount Lowe (British Columbia), a mountain in British Columbia, Canada
 Mount Lowe (California), a mountain in California, United States
 Mount Lowe (Oregon), a mountain in Oregon, United States
 Mount Lowe (Wisconsin), a mountain in Wisconsin, United States